A by-election was held for the New South Wales Legislative Assembly electorate of Kiama on 3 November 1870 because of the resignation of Henry Parkes due to financial difficulties following the failure of his importing venture.

Dates

Results

Henry Parkes resigned due to financial difficulties.

Aftermath
Parkes return to parliament was short lived as he was subsequently forced into bankruptcy in December 1870, forcing another by-election.

See also
Electoral results for the district of Kiama
List of New South Wales state by-elections

References

1870 elections in Australia
New South Wales state by-elections
1870s in New South Wales